Zheng Guogu (born 1970) is an artist based in Yangjiang in the Guangdong province of China, one of three artists in the artist collective known as Yangjiang Group. In 1992, he graduated from the printmaking department of the Guangzhou Academy of Fine Arts.

Guogu makes work in different media including photography, installation, painting and sculpture.  His photographic work questions the post-Cultural Revolution generation’s attitudes to the world around them and has used of contact sheets to make storyboard-like images. Guogu ives and works in Yangjiang, Guangdong province. He was the winner of the 2006 Chinese Contemporary Art Reward.

Early life
Zheng Guogu was born in 1970 in Yangjiang, in the southwest part of Guangdong province. Known for its knife and scissor factories, it is situated on the edge of the China South Sea. Yangjiang became a town in 1988 when farmers and others from the outlying rural areas were encouraged to move there to participate in a new economic enterprise zone. Zheng Guogu comes from an artistic family. His father is a traditional instrument maker and a singer, who has at times worked for the Hong Kong Opera, a five-hour drive east from Yangjiang.

During the years that Zheng Guogu was growing up, things were already changing in China as the Maoist period receded into the past and the country opened up to the rest of the world. He and his generation had access to the West and Hong Kong through television, pirated CVDs of Hollywood films and computer games. So although he was physically isolated, he was accessing the West, albeit virtually, at a young enough age so as to take these new experiences and freedoms for granted. He attended the Guangdong Academy of Art in Guangzhou, China's third culture capital, with a focus on printmaking.

While a student there, he was introduced to a slightly older group of artists that formed the Big Tail Elephant Group (Lin Yilin, Chen Shaoxiong, Xu Tan and Liang Juhui) in 1991, and they encouraged the younger artist to experiment with performance and conceptual art.

Artist profile
Zheng Guogu is one among a growing number of postmodern artists who have been reacting to the rapid shifts taking place in China over the past ten years by giving artistic shape to the phases of social and economic transformation. What distinguishes him is his commitment to the local culture of his hometown and his role in directing attention to it, while engaging with trends in global contemporary art. The international art world has fallen in love with contemporary Chinese art, and somehow Zheng Guogu, although often included in group exhibitions in Asia and Europe, has not been singled out often enough. He juggles fact with fiction or myth, while controlling the entry points to his community for visitors from the art world, who make the trek to visit him in the small town where he lives and works.

"Through Popular Expression" display
Zheng Guogu’s works in his "Through Popular Expression" display are the response of the artist to commercial trends. His work Computer controlled by pig’s brain No. 59 belongs to his series Computer controlled by pig’s brain. This series is a refraction of how the media is overflowing and stimulating our everyday life. In these works he uses different elements of Hong Kong pop-culture magazines, which address people’s senses and their attraction to our consumerist branding culture. Put on the leatherette-canvas, the elements engender a corresponding ‘fancy’ effect. Sewing for another two thousands years is a textile work and part the needlepoint series, typical of his style in which traditional canvas-painting takes on the traits of embroidered carpet or wallpaper. The One hundred and fifty 10000 customers series was made as an homage to Hans van Dijk, the late Dutch curator who had a major influence in Chinese art after 1985, and a challenge to the contemporary art market to find 10,000 buyers for this series of works which, theoretically, consists of as many pieces. Each single work shows a daily news image composed out of a grid of hundreds of small photos of motorcycles. 150 different pieces together shows the massiveness of our volume-oriented, consumer culture. Zheng Guogu’s works aren’t judgments or counter-attacks, they are just enlargements of our reality

Selected exhibitions
2016

Chinese Whispers, Museum of Fine Arts Bern, Bern, Switzerland

2006

Through Popular Expression, The University of Central England in Birmingham, UK

Take Down, Beijing

Kunstmuseum Bern, Switzerland

2005

Out of Sight, Amsterdam

Puzzle—It is from Yangjiang, Grace Alexander Contemporary Art Gallery, Switzerland

Millennium, Mori Art Museum, Tokyo

2004

A l’ouest du sud de l’est, Center of Contemporary Art, Sète/Villa Arson in Nice, France

From China, ICP International Center of Photography, New York

My Home Is Your Museum, Vitamin Creative Space, Guangzhou

2003

50th Biennale di Venezia, Venezia, Italy

2002

Paris-Pekin, Espace Pierre Cardin, Paris

Are You Going to Enjoy Calligraphy or Measure Blood Pressure? Shanghai

2000

More Dimensional, Caaw, Beijing

2001

Hamburger Bahnhof Museum für Gegenwart, Berlin Art Forum

Individual Pieces Of Work
 Guogu's piece titled "Ad, Rust For Another Two Thousand Years (set of 33, various sizes)"—auction results

References

External links
Zheng Guogu on ArtNet.com
Zheng Guogu at 88MoCCA: The Museum of Chinese Contemporary Art on the Web
Further information, texts and images from the Saatchi Gallery
Additional information on ChinaArtNetworks.com

Painters from Guangdong
Chinese photographers
Living people
1970 births
People from Yangjiang
Chinese contemporary artists